Frank Geoffrey Laskier (1912 – 8 July 1949) New Brighton Wirral,was a British seaman who came to public attention during World War II.

In late 1940, Laskier was a gunner in the Merchant Navy when his ship was attacked and sunk by a German raider off the coast of West Africa. Rescued from a raft and returned to Britain, he was interviewed by BBC radio. His famous "My Name is Frank" broadcasts during the Battle of the Atlantic affected popular opinion about the war and helped Merchant Navy recruitment efforts in America and Britain.

"Seaman Frank" became a figurehead of the Merchant Navy in newsreels, speaking tours and autobiographical books. By the war's end, sentiment had moved on and he was largely forgotten. At age 37, he died in a car accident in New York City. Today, the little that is remembered about Laskier is mixed; one observer described him as just an icon of wartime propaganda, but another critic considers Laskier's autobiographical writing to be "powerful" and the "genuine article" about a seaman's life.

Biography

Laskier was born in New Brighton Wirral and brought up near the wharves of Liverpool, Lancashire. At age 15 he ran away from home and spent the next ten years working his way around the world from one merchant ship to the next. He drank heavily, patronised prostitutes and even spent a few years in prison for theft; he was the black sheep of his family.

In late 1940, Laskier's ship, Eurylochus, on which he served as a gunner, was attacked and sunk by a merchant raider, the German auxiliary cruiser Kormoran, off the coast of West Africa. He lost a foot to machine gun fire. After two days on a raft, with no water and fending off sharks, he and the remaining crew were rescued by a neutral Spanish merchant ship, Monte Teide. Laskier was repatriated to Britain where it was said, a young BBC radio producer overheard him tell his story in a Liverpool public house. He was convinced to recount his story on J. B. Priestley's Postscript show (Sunday 5 October 1941), so-named because it aired following the news. The Postscript episode, and an encore appearance in which "a merchant seaman talks", reached a wide audience and proved popular with listeners. Laskier was lionised by the press. British journalist Douglas Reed described him:

The stories were collected in the book My Name is Frank (1941) of which a reviewer in The Spectator said, "Frank Laskier's broadcasts had the stuff of greatness; put into print they lose nothing in the reading. By a natural genius this seaman has found an expression and a rhythm which the poets and artists of the modern world have been striving after for generations." Soon after, Frank appeared in propaganda films to encourage enlistment in the Merchant Marines and went on speaking tours around the United States.

One film is a Crown Film Unit production called Seaman Frank Goes Back to Sea which shows Frank patriotically re-enlisting for the Merchant Navy; the narrator calls him a "real Englishman" who does his duty. In another clip for British Pathé, in 1941, Laskier says he wants to go out fighting again (re-enlist) to avenge the deaths of his friends, while the romantic interest with "Mary" would have to wait. He finishes with a rousing statement about losing his foot to machine gun fire from the German raider Kormoran: "Do you think I'm going to let them get away with that?" he vows, "Not pygmalion likely!"

Laskier's second book, Log Book (1942), was positioned as fiction but is clearly autobiographical, with the main character being called "Jack". Reviewing the book in the New York Herald Tribune Lincoln Colcord called it, "a work of art so simple and acute, that one often pauses to wonder." After the war Laskier moved to the US, where he tried to garner interest for an autobiographical film, but to little avail. His third and final book, Unseen Harbor, was published in 1947; it is pure fiction. Laskier died on 8 July 1949, aged 37, in a car accident in New York City.

"Seaman Frank" and his works have largely been forgotten, "Laskier was quickly forgotten when his propaganda value had faded." Tony Lane refers to him as a "Stakhanov", the Russian coal miner made a workers' hero by Soviet propagandists. However, his writing still garners praise; The Neglected Books Page, an online site that seeks to uncover neglected but deserving books, found Log Book to be "powerful" and the "genuine article" about a seaman's life.

Works
 Seaman Frank Laskier Describes His Experiences (Two-shellac 78rpm disc set of the Postscript broadcast 5 October 1941)
 My Name Is Frank (1941; transcriptions of BBC radio shows)
 Log Book (1942; autobiographical novel)
 Film documentary The Call of the Sea (1942; as narrator)
 Unseen Harbor (1947; novel)
 "Justice Rides the Bus Line", Coronet, April 1946
 "The House That Courage Built", Coronet, Vol. 21, issue 2
 "A Nice Cup of Tea", Esquire, 1948 (Volume 28)
 "Alfred and the Staff of Life", Collier's Weekly, 6 December 1947
 "The Indisposition of Mister Macdougal", Collier's Weekly, 14 February 1948

References

External links
(video) "The Seaman Who Gave The Postscript", British Pathé, 1941
William DuBois, "An Englishman with a Job To Do", New York Times, 12 September 1943

1912 births
1949 deaths
British writers
British Merchant Navy personnel of World War II
United Kingdom home front during World War II
Propaganda in the United Kingdom
Road incident deaths in New York City